Mladý muž a bílá velryba: Malý chemický epos is a Czech novel, written by Vladimír Páral. It was first published in 1973.

1973 Czech novels